Frank Broome (11 June 1915 – 10 September 1994) was an English professional footballer and manager. He played for Aston Villa during his professional career and won seven caps as an England striker, scoring three times, including once against Germany on his debut in 1938. 

Frank Broome attended Victoria  School, Berkhamsted, Herts where he excelled as centre forward in the school team. He began playing for Berkhamsted Town in 1933 and soon began to attract the attention of scouts from Charlton, Chelsea, Luton, Tottenham Hotspur and West Ham. In Jan and Feb 1934, Broome scored five goals in two consecutive matches, including against Aylesbury Utd in the Bucks Senior Cup, further enhancing his profile. In October 1934 Broome was selected to play for a team representing the Spartan League against a Tottenham Hotspur Combination 11 at Maidenhead. He scored both goals in a 3-2 defeat. He played again for the Spartan League team a couple of weeks later against an Isthmian League team at Chesham. His place in the Berkhamsted team was taken by his brother Reg. 

His impressive form earned him a trial for Aston Villa. He scored six goals for the Villa Colts side in a 15-0 victory over Moor Green on 31 Oct. The performance was enough to convince for Villa to sign him up professionally in Nov 1934 and he duly scored another four goals against Stoke City. A report of the match stated that although Broome was on the 'small side, he has a fine turn of speed and can trick an opponent cleverly'.

Having helped win promotion for Villa in the previous season, the 1937–38 pre-season Jubilee Fund matches saw Villa pitched against local rivals West Bromwich Albion. The derby match ended in a 1–1 draw with Broome scoring for Villa and Harry Jones grabbing one for the Baggies.

Broome guested for Nottingham Forest during WW2, making 3 appearances (1 goal) in 1939–40, 1 appearance (4 goals) in 1940–41 and 10 appearances (4 goals) in 1941–42. He also guested for Wolves during wartime, playing and scoring in the 1942 War Cup Final. 

In 1955 Broome signed for Shelbourne, making his League of Ireland debut on 27 February. The nearest he came to scoring was when he had a penalty saved at Glenmalure Park on 27 March in the FAI Cup.

Approaching 40 years of age and coupled with the expense of weekly flights to Dublin he ended up only playing 6 games for Shels.

After retiring from playing, he went on to manage both Exeter City, Southend United and in Australia.

References

External links 

 Player profile at Aston Villa Players Database
 Player Profile at englandstats.com

1915 births
1994 deaths
English footballers
England international footballers
English Football League players
Berkhamsted Town F.C. players
Aston Villa F.C. players
Watford F.C. wartime guest players
Derby County F.C. players
Notts County F.C. players
Brentford F.C. players
Crewe Alexandra F.C. players
Shelbourne F.C. players
English football managers
Exeter City F.C. managers
Southend United F.C. managers
League of Ireland players
English expatriate football managers
Expatriate soccer managers in Australia
Parramatta FC managers
English expatriate sportspeople in Australia
Association football forwards
Association football outside forwards
People from Berkhamsted
Footballers from Hertfordshire